Callender Lake is a census-designated place (CDP) in Van Zandt County, Texas, United States. This was a new CDP for the 2010 census with a population of 1039.

Geography
Callender Lake is located at  (32.367527, -95.698355).

References

Census-designated places in Van Zandt County, Texas
Census-designated places in Texas